Albert City–Truesdale Community School District (AC-T) is a school district that operates a single elementary school, Albert City–Truesdale Elementary School, in Albert City, Iowa. The district, which also serves Truesdale, is mostly in Buena Vista County, but also is located in sections of Pocahontas County.

Albert City–Truesdale sends its high school students to the Sioux Central Community School District. The district decided to begin sending its junior and senior high school students elsewhere in 2004, causing the Albert City–Truesdale Secondary School to end operations. AC-T signed a ten-year grade sharing agreement with Sioux Central in 2006.

References

External links
 Albert City-Truesdale Community School District

School districts in Iowa
Education in Buena Vista County, Iowa
Education in Pocahontas County, Iowa